Shree Yadav Secondary School is a public high school in the Naya Belhani Village Development Committee, ward number 2, Tamaspur, Nawalparasi, Nepal.

Schools in Nepal